Jon Everist is an American video game composer.  He is responsible for the score to BattleTech (video game), which he received an American Society of Composers, Authors and Publishers “Composer’s Choice Award” nomination  for “Best Video Game Score of 2018” and won honors at the 2019 Jerry Goldsmith Awards for Best Video Game Score. His score for Shadowrun: Hong Kong received favorable reviews, and its predecessor Shadowrun: Dragonfall was named one of PC Gamers “Top 100 PC Games of All Time”.  He is mostly known for his work with Seattle developer Harebrained Schemes and for hybrid scores that utilize live orchestra and a variety of synthesizers.

Biography 
Everist began his musical pursuits in his middle school band, played the drums. After being exposed to groups like Radiohead, Aphex Twin, MF Doom, and Aesop Rock, Soon after Everist's interests steered toward playing and experimenting with analog synths and samplers – producing music on an Ensoniq ASR-10 sampler, recording everything into Sony Acid.

After High School, being told there was no money or stability in music, Everist pursued studies in Economics at the University of Washington and sold copiers during the day and made music at night and some small tours, keeping his music and professional work life separate. After hearing Amon Tobin’s score for Chaos Theory and Disasterpeace’s score for FEZ in 2012, Everist left his job. Cashing out his retirement he enrolled at DigiPen Institure of Technology to study music and sound for video games at age of 28.

While enrolled at DigiPen Institure of Technology, Everist had done music for several student games that Jenn Tran, Director and Cinematographer, who was a concept artist for Harebrained Schemes at the time. The creative relationship blossomed helping Everist secure the opportunity to score a trailer for Shadowrun: Returns with Harebrained Schemes, leading towards opening the door for Everist to work on Golem Arcana, Shadowrun: Dragonfall, and other releases from the company propelling him into the industry.

In an in-depth interview with VGMOnline, Everist would talk more on his road from corporate work into composing. Talking of his early work for Shadowrun: Dragonfall and the different approach he took from the existing music that had existed for the franchise, filling in the emotional gaps that had been missing from the largely dystopian cyberpunk sound palette, as well as adding his own expertise in music production.

Everist's score to 2018's BattleTech would prove a monument to his orchestral and synth fusion sound. Pitched as a "Game of Thrones in Space", Everist would use his skills as a synth musician and producer and marry it to material he wrote for the enlisted European orchestras and ensembles that would help bring to score to completion.

In 2020 Everist's score accompanying V1 Interactive's Disintegration, was released. The score was recorded with the Budapest Scoring Orchestra, with Brendon Williams helping with orchestration duties. In a radio conversation with Kate Remington of NPR (WSHU), Everist would tell his inspiration for the score and Main Theme, coming from the idea of the "fragility of humankind against all odds." Telling The Sound Architect's, Sam Hughes "I wanted to capture both the fragility and hopefulness of the human spirit...The solo piano motif propels the piece to a crescendo with the rest of the orchestra where our heroic theme is revealed, representing the power and ingenuity of humanity coming together for a common good. This is the theme of the resistance.”

From a press release with Gamasutra, Disintegration's Audio Lead at V1 Interactive, Jack Menhorn, describes the creative process and collaboration with Everist: "When we started working with Jon, the main theme was the first piece we tackled as it would set the tone and character of the rest of Disintegration's music. There was so much to get right with this piece: the 'earworm' melody that people would remember, the struggle and eventual heroic victory of our characters, as well as the general vibe of the game we were still figuring out ourselves. Jon has nailed each of these criteria masterfully and went on to do the same with all of the music in the game.

Everist would also score a commercial highlight spot for Nokia's virtual reality camera, OZO.

Works

References

External links 
 Official Website
 Jon Everist on IMDb
 Jon Everist on Twitter
 Discography at VGMdb
 MobyGames rap sheet
 Jon Everist discography at Discogs

American film score composers
Living people
American male film score composers
Musicians from Seattle
Video game composers
Year of birth missing (living people)